The 120th district of the Texas House of Representatives contains parts of eastern San Antonio. The district also includes parts of Kirby, Windcrest, and Converse. The current Representative is Barbara Gervin-Hawkins, who was first elected in 2016.

References 

120